The Samurai in Autumn is a 2016 Serbian comedy film directed by Danilo Bećković.

Cast 
 Petar Strugar - Vladica
 Hristina Popović - Snezana
 Nikola Kojo - Miloje
 Sergej Trifunović - 
 Andrija Milošević - Janko
 Petar Novićević - Vukasin
 Miodrag Krstović - Delegat 
 Katarina Žutić - Rada

References

External links 

2016 comedy films
Films set in Serbia
Serbian comedy films